Stigmella pyrellicola is a moth of the family Nepticulidae. It is found in Greece, Turkey and Cyprus.

The larvae feed on Rhamnus lycioides, Rhamnus oleoides microphyllus and Rhamnus pyrellus. They mine the leaves of their host plant. The mine consists of a long corridor that runs through the leaf two to three times. The frass is concentrated in a broad central line.

External links
Fauna Europaea
bladmineerders.nl

Nepticulidae
Moths of Europe
Moths of Asia
Moths described in 1978